Rimboval is a commune in the Pas-de-Calais department in the Hauts-de-France region of France.

Geography
Rimboval is located 10 miles (16 km) northeast of Montreuil-sur-Mer on the D149 road.

Population

Places of interest
 The church of St. Omer, dating from the sixteenth century.
 A watermill

See also
 Communes of the Pas-de-Calais department

References

Communes of Pas-de-Calais